Mauro Depergola (born 20 May 1981) is an Argentine para table tennis player who competes in international level events. He is a double Pan American table tennis champion and has won five medals including two golds at the Parapan American Games.

References

1981 births
Living people
Sportspeople from Buenos Aires
Paralympic table tennis players of Argentina
Table tennis players at the 2016 Summer Paralympics
Medalists at the 2011 Parapan American Games
Medalists at the 2015 Parapan American Games
Medalists at the 2019 Parapan American Games
Table tennis players at the 2020 Summer Paralympics
Argentine male table tennis players
21st-century Argentine people